Regional Institute of Management and Technology (RIMT) is a private institution for engineering and management education located in Mandi Gobindgarh, Punjab, India

Approvals
 University Grants Commission (India)
 All India Council for Technical Education
 Bar Council of India
 Pharmacy Council of India
Council of architecture

Schools
 School of Agriculture
 School of Architecture
 School of Applied Science
 School of Art & Design
 School of Bio Sciences
 School of Commerce
 School of Computer Application
 School of Engineering
 School of Education
 School of Hospitality
 School of Humanities
 School of Journalism
 School of Legal Studies
 School of Library Sciences
 School of Management
 School of Health Sciences
 School of Nursing
 School of Pharmaceutical

Festivals and events
Conatus is the annual cultural and arts festival held in September. Intelloasis and e-vision are the annual tech-fests held at college.
RIMT organizes annual sports week in the month of march.

References

Universities in Punjab, India
Fatehgarh Sahib district

Engineering colleges in Punjab, India
1998 establishments in Punjab, India
Educational institutions established in 1998